Nothris sulcella is a moth in the family Gelechiidae. It was described by Staudinger in 1859. It is found in Asia Minor.

The wingspan is about 32 mm. The forewings are grey with three black dots in the fold, before and at the end of the cell. There are dark streaks at the outer margin. The hindwings are light grey in females and dark grey in males.

References

Chelariini
Moths described in 1859